This is a list of boxing families with two or more notable boxers.  Many families have had multiple members become famous in the sport of boxing, with some having held multiple world titles. While this does not have extensive details, their highest career achievements are listed.

Argentina
Matthysse siblings
Walter Matthysse: 1978-08-29 to ----, WBO Latino welterweight champion
Edith Soledad Matthysse: 1980-08-06 to ----, WBA and WBC female featherweight champion
Lucas Matthysse: 1982-09-27 to ----, WBA (Regular) welterweight, WBC interim light welterweight champion

Bermúdez siblings
Gustavo David Bermúdez: 1988–02–05 to ----, WBC Latino interim light welterweight champion
Daniela Romina Bermúdez: 1989–07–07 to ----, WBO female super flyweight; IBF, and WBO female bantamweight champion
Roxana Ayelyn Bermúdez: 1995–07–19 to ----
Evelyn Nazarena Bermúdez: 1996–04–01 to ----, IBF female light flyweight champion

Australia

Mundine family
Tony Mundine (born 1951), Commonwealth middleweight champion; Australian middleweight, light heavyweight, cruiserweight and heavyweight champion
Anthony Mundine (Tony's son; born 1975), WBA super middleweight champion; IBO middleweight champion

Brazil
Falcão brothers
Yamaguchi Falcão: 1987-12-24 to ---, WBO Latino middleweight champion, silver medal at 2011 Pan American Games, bronze at 2012 Olympics
Esquiva Falcão: 1989-12-12 to ---, Middleweight bronze medal at 2011 World Championships, silver at 2012 Summer Olympics

Bulgaria
Pulev brothers
Kubrat Pulev: 1981-05-04 to ----, European heavyweight champion
Tervel Pulev: 1983-01-10 to ----, Bronze medal at 2012 Summer Olympics, European cruiserweight champion

Canada

Gatti brothers
Joe Gatti (born 1967), light middleweight world title challenger
Arturo Gatti (1972–2009), IBF super featherweight champion; WBC light welterweight champion

Hilton family
Dave Hilton Sr. (born 1940), Canadian middleweight champion
Dave Hilton Jr. (Dave Sr.'s son; born 1963), WBC super middleweight champion
Alex Hilton (Dave Sr.'s son; born 1964), Canadian middleweight champion
Matthew Hilton (Dave Sr.'s son; born 1965), IBF light middleweight champion

Vanderpool brothers
Fitz Vanderpool (born 1967), World Boxing Federation (WBF) welterweight and light middleweight champion
Syd Vanderpool (born 1972), WBO-NABO super middleweight champion

Colombia
Cardona brothers
Prudencio Cardona: 1951-12-22 to 2019-08-04, WBC flyweight champion
Ricardo Cardona: 1952-11-09 to 2015-10-12, WBA super bantamweight champion

Cuba
Savón family
Félix Savón: 1967-12-22 to ----, Gold medals at 1992, 1996 and 2000 Summer Olympics, and 1986, 1989, 1991, 1993, 1995 and 1997 World Championships
Erislandy Savón: 1990-07-20 to ----, (Félix's nephew), Bronze medal at 2016 Summer Olympics, gold medal at 2017 World Championships

Ribalta brothers
José Ribalta (eldest): welterweight
José Ribalta (middle): heavyweight, 1976 Giraldo Córdova Cardín participant, fought Teófilo Stevenson three times in the mid-1970s, also fought Aziz Salihu
José Manuel Ribalta (youngest): 1963-03-31 to ----, heavyweight, 1979-1981 Florida State Golden Gloves Champion and AAU District Champ, 1981 National Golden Gloves finalist, WBC contender during the mid-1980s and the early 1990s, fought James Smith, Mike Tyson, Leon Spinks, Larry Holmes, Vitali Klitschko, Chris Byrd, Donovan Ruddock

Denmark
Bredahl brothers
Jimmi Bredahl: 1967-08-26 to ----, WBO, IBO, European super featherweight champion
Johnny Bredahl: 1968-08-27 to ----, WBA, IBO, WBU, European bantamweight, WBO super flyweight champion; first Danish WBA champion

The only brothers in the world to become world champions the same night at the same event. Took place at Parken Stadium on September 4, 1992.

Dominican Republic
Cruz brothers
Carlos Cruz: 1937-11-24 to 1970-02-15, WBA, and WBC lightweight champion
Leo Cruz: 1953-01-17 to ----, WBA super bantamweight champion

France
Tiozzo brothers
Christophe Tiozzo: 1963-06-01 to ----, WBA super middleweight champion
Fabrice Tiozzo: 1969-05-08 to ----, WBA, and WBC light heavyweight, WBA cruiserweight champion

Germany
Rocchigiani brothers
Ralf Rocchigiani: 1963-02-13 to ----, WBO cruiserweight champion
Graciano Rocchigiani: 1963-12-29 to 2018-10-01 , IBF super middleweight, WBC light heavyweight champion

Italy
Dundee brothers (first siblings to become world champions)
Joe Dundee: 1903-08-06 to 1982-03-31, NYSAC welterweight champion
Vince Dundee: 1907-10-22 to 1949-07-27, NYSAC middleweight champion

Stecca brothers
Loris Stecca: 1960-03-30 to ----, WBA super bantamweight champion
Maurizio Stecca: 1963-03-09 to ----, WBO featherweight champion

Japan
Ioka family
Kazunori Ioka: 1967-07-27 to ----, (Kazuto's father), Promoter
Hiroki Ioka: 1969-01-08 to ----, (Kazunori's brother), WBC mini flyweight, WBA light flyweight champion
Kazuto Ioka: 1989-03-24 to ----, (Kazunori's son & Hiroki's cousin), WBA mini flyweight, WBC mini flyweight, WBA light flyweight, WBA flyweight, WBO super flyweight champion

Kameda family
Shiro Kameda: 1965-05-22 to ----, Trainer of Kameda brothers
Koki Kameda: 1986-11-17 to ----, (Shiro's son), WBA light flyweight, WBA bantamweight, WBC flyweight champion
Daiki Kameda: 1989-01-06 to ----, (Shiro's son), WBA flyweight, IBF super flyweight champion
Tomoki Kameda: 1991-07-12 to ----, (Shiro's son), WBO bantamweight champion

Inoue family
Koki Inoue: 1992-05-11 to ----, (Naoya's cousin), WBO Asia Pacific light welterweight champion
Naoya Inoue: 1993-04-10 to ----, WBC light flyweight, WBO super flyweight, and WBA (Super), IBF, and The Ring bantamweight champion
Takuma Inoue: 1995-12-26 to ----, (Naoya's brother), WBC interim bantamweight champion

Noguchi family
Susumu Noguchi, welterweight champion
Kyō Noguchi, flyweight champion
Osamu Noguchi,  boxing promotor

Mexico
Álvarez brothers
Rigoberto Álvarez: 1978-01-20 to ----, WBA interim light middleweight champion
Ricardo Álvarez: 1981-11-21 to ----, WBC Latino and WBC Continental Americas light welterweight champion
Ramon Álvarez: 1986-05-28 to ----, WBC-NABF light middleweight champion
Canelo Álvarez: 1990-07-18 to ----, WBA (Unified), WBC, WBO, and The Ring light middleweight, WBA (Super), WBC, IBF, and The Ring middleweight, WBA (Super), WBC, WBO, and The Ring super middleweight, and WBO light heavyweight champion

Arce brothers
Jorge Arce: 1979-07-27 to ----, WBC, WBO light flyweight, WBO super flyweight, WBO bantamweight, WBO super bantamweight champion
Francisco Arce Armenta: 1981-08-29 to ----, WBC-NABF super bantamweight champion

Arredondo brothers
Ricardo Arredondo: 1949-05-26 to 1991-09-20, WBC super featherweight champion
Roberto Arredondo: 1958-05-03 to ----, Japanese featherweight champion
René Arredondo: 1961-06-15 to ----, WBC light welterweight champion

Burgos family
Víctor Burgos: 1974-04-10 to ----, IBF light flyweight champion
Juan Carlos Burgos: 1987-12-26 to ----, (Victor's nephew), WBC Silver super featherweight champion

Castillo brothers
José Luis Castillo: 1973-12-14 to ----, WBC lightweight champion
Ricardo Castillo: 1979-06-07 to ----, WBC-NABF featherweight champion

Chávez family
Julio César Chávez: 1962-07-12 to ----, WBC super featherweight, WBA, and WBC lightweight, WBC, and IBF light welterweight champion
Roberto Chávez González: ---- to ----, (Julio's brother), bantamweight
Julio César Chávez Jr.: 1986-02-16 to ----, (Julio's son), WBC middleweight champion
Omar Chávez: 1990-01-04 to ----, (Julio's son), WBO-NABO light middleweight champion

Díaz brothers
Joel Díaz: 1973-02-18 to ----, IBF lightweight champion
Antonio Díaz: 1976-06-13 to ----, IBA light welterweight champion
Julio Díaz: 1979-12-24 to ----, IBF lightweight champion

Espadas family
Guty Espadas: 1954-12-20 to ----, WBA flyweight champion
Guty Espadas Jr.: 1974-09-02 to ----, (Guty's son), WBC featherweight champion

García brothers
Raúl García: 1982-09-10 to ----, IBF, and WBO mini flyweight champion
Ramón García Hirales: 1982-09-10 to ----, WBO light flyweight champion

González family
Alejandro Martín González: 1973-08-11 to ----, WBC featherweight champion
Alejandro González Jr.: 1993-03-08 to ----, (Alejandro's son), super bantamweight

Juárez sisters
Mariana Juárez: 1980-01-29 to ----, WBC female flyweight and WBC female bantamweight champion
Lourdes Juárez: 1986-12-19 to ----, WBC female super flyweight champion

Karass brothers
Jesús Soto Karass: 1982-10-15 to ----, WBC-NABF welterweight champion

López family
Ricardo Lopez: 1966-01-25 to ----, WBA, WBC, and WBO mini flyweight, IBF light flyweight champion
Alonso López: 1986-05-28 to ----, (Ricardo's son), flyweight

Margarito family
Antonio Margarito: 1978-03-18 to ----, WBA, IBF, and WBO welterweight champion
Hanzel Martínez: 1991-11-21 to ----, (Antonio's brother-in-law), bantamweight

Márquez brothers
Juan Manuel Márquez: 1973-08-23 to ----, IBF & WBO featherweight, WBC super featherweight, WBA, and WBO lightweight, WBO light welterweight champion
Rafael Márquez: 1975-03-25 to ----, IBF, and IBO bantamweight champion

Mijares family
Vicente Mijares: 1954-06-14 to ----, lightweight
Cristian Mijares: 1981-10-02 to ----, (Vicente's nephew), WBA, WBC, and IBF super flyweight champion
Ricardo Mijares: 1988-06-14 to ----, (Vicente's nephew), lightweight

Montiel family
Manuel Montiel Sr.: ---- to ----, 1970s flyweight and trainer
Alejandro Felix Montiel: 1971-04-24 to ----, (Manuel Sr.'s son), IBA flyweight champion
Pedro Montiel: 1973-11-30 to ----, (Manuel Sr.'s son), middleweight
Fernando Montiel: 1979-03-01 to ----, (Manuel Sr.'s son), WBO flyweight, WBO super flyweight, WBC, and WBO bantamweight champion
Manuel Montiel Jr.: ---- to ----, (Manuel Sr.'s son), bantamweight
Eduardo Montiel: ---- to ----, (Manuel Sr.'s son), middleweight

Morales family
José Morales: ---- to ----, 1970s boxing contender, Erik's manager
Érik Morales: 1976-09-01 to ----, (Jose's son), WBC, and WBO super bantamweight, WBC featherweight, WBC, and IBF super featherweight, WBC light welterweight champion
Diego Morales: 1979-12-11 to ----, (Jose's son), WBO super flyweight champion
Iván Morales: 1991-10-09 to ----, (Jose's son), bantamweight prospect

Páez family
Jorge Páez: 1965-10-27 to ----, IBF, and WBO featherweight champion
Jorge Páez Jr.: 1987-11-30 to ----, (Jorge's son), WBC Youth Intercontinental welterweight champion
Azriel Páez: 1989-05-28 to ----, (Jorge's son), welterweight

Ruelas brothers
Gabriel Ruelas: 1970-07-23 to ----, WBC super featherweight champion
Rafael Ruelas: 1971-04-26 to ----, IBF lightweight champion

Sánchez family
Salvador Sánchez: 1959-01-26 to 1982-08-12, WBC featherweight champion
Salvador Sánchez II: 1985-09-20 to ----, (Salvador's nephew), featherweight

Solís brothers
Jorge Solís: 1979-10-23 to ----, WBA interim super featherweight champion
Ulises Solís: 1981-08-28 to ----, IBF light flyweight champion

Zárate family
Carlos Zárate: 1951-05-23 to ----, WBC bantamweight champion
Joel Luna Zárate: 1965-11-12 to ----, (Carlos's nephew), WBO Latino super flyweight champion
Carlos Zárate Jr.: 1988-05-23 to ----, (Carlos's son), light welterweight

Norway
Havnå family
Magne Havnå: 1963-09-16 to 2004-05-29, WBO cruiserweight champion
Kai Robin Havnå: 1989-01-20 to ----, (Magne's son), IBO International cruiserweight champion

Panama
Durán family
Roberto Durán: 1951-06-16 to ----, WBA, and WBC lightweight, WBC welterweight, WBA light middleweight, WBC middleweight champion
Santiago Samaniego: 1974-01-25 to ----, (Roberto's nephew), WBA light middleweight champion
Irichelle Durán: 1976-11-18 to ----, (Roberto's daughter), super bantamweight

Pedroza Family
Eusebio Pedroza: 1956-03-02 to 2019-03-01, WBA featherweight champion
Rafael Pedroza: 1955-03-27 to ----, (Eusebio's cousin), WBA super flyweight champion

Philippines
Donaire family
Glenn Donaire: 1979-12-07 to ----, (Nonito's brother), WBC Latino super flyweight champion
Nonito Donaire: 1982-11-16 to ----, IBF, and IBO flyweight, WBA (Super), WBC, and WBO bantamweight, WBO, IBF, and The Ring super bantamweight, WBA (Super) featherweight champion
Richard Donaire: 1987-05-25 to ----, (Nonito's cousin), super flyweight

Magramo family
Ric Magramo Sr.: ---- to ----, 1960s Flyweight contender
Ric Magramo Jr.: 1961-11-06 to ----, (Ric Sr.'s son), light flyweight
Melvin Magramo: 1971-04-28 to ----, WBO Inter-Continental, and OPBF flyweight champion
Ronnie Magramo: 1972 to ----, WBF mini flyweight champion
Giemel Magramo: 1994-10-05 to ----, (Melvin's son), WBC International flyweight champion

Pacquiao brothers
Manny Pacquiao: 1978-12-17 to ----, WBC flyweight, IBF super bantamweight, WBA (Super), IBF, and The Ring featherweight, WBC, and The Ring super featherweight, WBC lightweight, IBO, and The Ring light welterweight, WBA (Super), and WBO welterweight, WBC light middleweight champion
Bobby Pacquiao: 1980-12-12 to ----, WBO Asia-Pacific lightweight champion

Pagara brothers
Jason Pagara: 1988-07-17 to ----, WBO Asia-Pacific Youth lightweight, WBO Asia-Pacific Youth and WBO International light welterweight champion
Albert Pagara: 1994-02-18 to ----, IBF Intercontinental, and WBO Intercontinental super bantamweight champion

Peñalosa family
Carl Peñalosa: 1938-03-02 to ----, lightweight and light welterweight
Jonathan Peñalosa: ---- to ----, (Carl's son), WBC International flyweight champion
Dodie Boy Peñalosa: 1962-11-19 to ----, (Carl's son), IBF light flyweight, IBF flyweight champion
Gerry Peñalosa: 1972-08-07 to ----, (Carl's son), WBC super flyweight, WBO bantamweight champion
Dodie Boy Jr.: 1991-02-20 to ----, (Carl's grandson), featherweight

Jaro family
Aljoe Jaro: 1973-05-19 to ----, 1980-90s super featherweight contender, Amnat Ruenroeng's trainer
Francisco Jaro: ---- to ----, (Aljoe's younger brother), Amnat Ruenroeng's trainer
Sonny Boy Jaro: 1982-03-24 to ----, (Francisco & Aljoe's cousin), WBC flyweight champion

Rubillar brothers
Ernesto Rubillar: 1970-12-26 to ----, mini flyweight and flyweight
Juanito Rubillar: 1977-02-22 to ----, light flyweight
Robert Rubilar: 1981-06-07 to ----, super bantamweight

Sonsona family
Eden Sonsona: 1988-12-27 to ----, Philippines Games & Amusement Board bantamweight champion
Marvin Sonsona: 1990-07-25 to ----, (Eden's cousin), WBO super flyweight champion

Poland
 Skrzecz brothers
 Grzegorz Skrzecz
 Paweł Skrzecz

 Kosedowski brothers
 Dariusz Kosedowski
 Krzysztof Kosedowski
 Leszek Kosedowski

Puerto Rico
Arroyo brothers
McJoe Arroyo: 1985-12-05 to ----, WBO Latino super flyweight champion
McWilliams Arroyo: 1985-12-05 to ----, WBO Latino flyweight champion

Bisbal brothers
Victor Bisbal: 1980-07-02 to ----, heavyweight
Gerardo Bisbal: 1984-09-11 to ----, amateur heavyweight
 
Camacho family
Héctor Camacho: 1962-05-24 to 2012-11-24, WBC super featherweight, WBC lightweight, WBO light welterweight, IBC welterweight, IBC middleweight, and IBC light middleweight champion
Felix Camacho: 1966-06-27 to ----, (Héctor's brother), WBF super bantamweight champion
Héctor Camacho Jr.: 1978-09-20 to ----, (Héctor's son), welterweight

Cotto family
José Miguel Cotto: 1977-06-22 to --, WBO Intercontinental super featherweight champion
Abner Cotto: 1987-08-10 to ----, (José's cousin), lightweight
Miguel Cotto: 1980-10-29 to ----, (José's brother), WBO light welterweight, WBA, and WBO welterweight, WBA light middleweight, WBC middleweight champion

Serrano sisters
Cindy Serrano: 1986-05-08 to ----, WBO female featherweight champion
Amanda Serrano: 1988-10-09 to ----, WBO female super flyweight, bantamweight, super bantamweight, featherweight, lightweight, light welterweight, and IBF female super featherweight champion

Solis brothers
Enrique Solis: ---- to ----, world title challenger
Santos Solis: 1954 to 2007, light welterweight, welterweight and light middleweight
Julian Solís: 1957-01-07 to ----, WBA bantamweight champion
Rafael Solis: 1958-01-02 to ----, super featherweight world title challenger

Vázquez family
Wilfredo Vázquez: 1960-08-02 to ----, WBA bantamweight, WBA super bantamweight, WBA featherweight champion
Wilfredo Vázquez Jr.: 1984-06-18 to ----, (Wilfredo's son), WBO super bantamweight champion

Romania
Simion brothers
Marian Simion: 1975-09-14 to ----, light middleweight silver medal at 2000 Summer Olympics
Dorel Simion: 1977-02-13 to ----, welterweight bronze medal at 2000 Summer Olympics

Thailand
Amateur 
Boonjumnong brothers
Manus Boonjumnong: 1980-06-23 to ----, light welterweight gold medal at 2004 Summer Olympics, silver medal at 2008 Summer Olympics
Non Boonjumnong: 1982-06-12 to ----, welterweight silver medal at 2007 AIBA World Championships

Kamsing brothers
Somrot Kamsing: 1971-11-24 to ----, light flyweight participant at 1996 Summer Olympics
Somluck Kamsing: 1973-01-16 to ----, featherweight gold medal at 1996 Summer Olympics

Jongjohor family
Somjit Jongjohor: 1975-01-19 to ----, flyweight gold medal at 2008 Summer Olympics
Veeraphol Jongjohor: ---- to ----, (Somjit's cousin) Best Male Boxer at 2017 Thailand Youth Amateur Boxing Championships

Pannon family
Suban Pannon: 1978-05-10 to ----, light flyweight gold medal at 1998 Asian Games
Bannaphol Pannon: ---- to ----, (Suban's son), welterweight bronze medal at 2017 Asian Youth Amateur Boxing Championships

Professional
Poontarat brothers
Payao Poontarat: 1957-10-18 to 2006-08-13, light flyweight bronze medal at 1976 Summer Olympics, WBC super flyweight champion
Panieng Poontarat: 1969-08-22 to ----, PABA light flyweight champion, Fahlan Sakkreerin Jr.'s trainer

Galaxy brothers
Khaosai Galaxy: 1959-05-15 to ----, WBA super flyweight champion
Kaokor Galaxy: 1959-05-15 to ----, WBA bantamweight champion

Payakaroon brothers
Samart Payakaroon: 1962-12-05 to ----, WBC super bantamweight champion
Kongtoranee Payakaroon: 1960-07-12 to ----, WBC, and WBA super flyweight challenger

Sor Vorapin brothers
Ratanapol Sor Vorapin: 1974-06-06 to ----, IBF mini flyweight champion
Ratanachai Sor Vorapin: 1976-11-01 to ----, WBO bantamweight champion
Kaichon Sor Vorapin: 1981-10-22 to ----, WBO Asian Pacific light flyweight champion
Kosol Sor Vorapin: 1984-05-05 to ----, PABA super bantamweight champion

Sitbangprachan brothers
Pichit Sitbangprachan: 1966-01-15 to ----, IBF flyweight champion
Pichitnoi Sitbangprachan: 1975-01-31 to ----, WBA light flyweight champion

Porpaoin brothers
Chana Porpaoin: 1966-03-25 to ----, WBA mini flyweight champion
Songkram Porpaoin: 1966-03-25 to ----, WBA interim mini flyweight champion

Charoen family
Wanwin Charoen: 1971-07-12 to ----, WBF mini flyweight challenger
Wandee Singwancha: 1980-02-05 to ----, (Wanwin's cousin) WBC mini flyweight, WBC interim light flyweight champion

Dejrath family
Takrawlek Dejrath: 1972-04-24 to ----, 1990s light flyweight contender
Chainoi Worawut: 1997-06-24 to ----, (Dejrath's nephew) WBC-ABC super bantamweight champion

Dutch Boy Gym brothers
Samson Dutch Boy Gym: 1972-07-11 to ----, WBF super flyweight champion
Dutch Boy Dutch Boy Gym: ---- to ----, 1990s contender

Sor Rungvisai brothers
Suriyan Sor Rungvisai: 1989-03-02 to ----, WBC super flyweight champion
Nawaphon Sor Rungvisai: 1991-09-02 to ----, WBC-ABC flyweight champion

Sakkreerin family
Fahlan Sakkreerin: 1968-04-11 to ----, IBF mini flyweight, WBF flyweight champion
Fahlan Sakkreerin Jr.: 1993-06-07 to ----, (Fahlan's son) IBF mini flyweight, IBF interim light flyweight challenger

Kratingdaenggym family
Poonsawat Kratingdaenggym: 1980-11-20 to----, WBA super bantamweight champion
Stamp Kratingdaenggym: 1998-01-07 to ----, (Poonsawat's cousin) WBA interim flyweight champion

Petchyindee family
Sagat Petchyindee: 1957-11-30 to----, WBC super bantamweight challenger
Suriya Prasathinphimai: 1980-04-02 to----, (Petchyindee's cousin) middleweight bronze medal at 2004 Summer Olympics

Phisitvuthinun family
Surachart Phisitvuthinun: 1950 to ----, 1960s contender, Venice Borkhorsor's boxing partner, Veeraphol Sahaprom, Suriyan Sor Rungvisai & Srisaket Sor Rungvisai's manager
Chokchai Phisitvuthinun: 1977 to ----, (Surachart's son), Suriyan Sor Rungvisai & Srisaket Sor Rungvisai's trainer

Ukraine
Klitschko brothers
Vitali Klitschko: 1971-07-19 to ----, WBC, WBO, and The Ring heavyweight champion
Wladimir Klitschko: 1976-03-25 to ----, super heavyweight gold medal at 1996 Summer Olympics, WBA (Super), IBF, WBO, IBO, and The Ring heavyweight champion

United Kingdom

Benn family
Nigel Benn (born 1964), WBO middleweight and WBC super middleweight champion
Conor Benn (Nigel's son; born 1996), WBA Continental welterweight champion

Booth brothers
Jason Booth (born 1977), British and Commonwealth flyweight champion; IBO super flyweight champion; Commonwealth bantamweight champion; British and Commonwealth super bantamweight champion
Nicky Booth (1980–2021), British and Commonwealth bantamweight champion

Dubois siblings
Daniel Dubois (born 1997), British, Commonwealth, and WBC Silver heavyweight champion
Caroline Dubois (born 2001), lightweight gold medal at 2018 Youth Olympics

Edwards brothers
Charlie Edwards (born 1993), WBC flyweight and British super flyweight champion
Sunny Edwards (born 1996), IBF flyweight and British super flyweight champion

Eubank family
Chris Eubank (born 1966), WBO middleweight and sBO uper middleweight champion
Chris Eubank Jr. (Chris Sr.'s son; born 1989), British and WBA interim middleweight champion; IBO super middleweight champion

Finnegan brothers
Chris Finnegan (1944–2009), British, Commonwealth, and European light heavyweight champion
Kevin Finnegan (1948–2008), British and European middleweight champion

Fury family
John Fury (Tyson's father; born 1964)
Peter Fury (Tyson's uncle; born 1968)
Andy Lee (Tyson's cousin; born 1984), WBO middleweight champion
Tyson Fury: (born 1988), WBA (Super), WBC, IBF, WBO, IBO, The Ring heavyweight champion
Hosea Burton (Tyson's cousin; born 1988), British light heavyweight champion
Hughie Fury (Tyson's cousin; born 1994), British heavyweight champion
Nathan Gorman (Tyson's cousin; born 1996), WBC International Silver heavyweight champion
Tommy Fury (Tyson's half brother; born 1999), light heavyweight and Love Island contestant

Hatton family
Ricky Hatton (born 1978), WBA, IBF, IBO, and The Ring light welterweight champion; WBA welterweight champion
Matthew Hatton (Ricky's brother; born 1981), European welterweight champion
Campbell Hatton (Ricky's son; born 2001)

Khan brothers
Amir Khan (born 1986), WBA (Super) and IBF light welterweight champion, 
Haroon Khan (born 1991), flyweight bronze medal at 2010 Commonwealth Games

London family
Jack London (1913–1963), British heavyweight champion
Brian London (Jack's son; 1934–2021), British heavyweight champion

Magee brothers
Terry Magee (born 1964), Northern Ireland Area light middleweight champion; BUI light middleweight champion
Noel Magee (born 1965), Commonwealth light heavyweight champion
Eamonn Magee (born 1971), Commonwealth light welterweight champion

McDonnell twins
Gavin McDonnell (born 1986), British and European super bantamweight champion
Jamie McDonnell (born 1986), WBA (Regular) and IBF bantamweight champion

Minter family
Alan Minter (1951 – 2020), WBC middleweight champion
Ross Minter (born 1978), English welterweight champion

Selby brothers
Lee Selby (born 1987), IBF featherweight champion
Andrew Selby (born 1988), flyweight silver medal at 2011 AIBA World Championships, flyweight bronze medal at 2013 AIBA World Championships

Smith brothers
Paul Smith (born 1982), British middleweight champion; British super middleweight champion
Stephen Smith (born 1985), British, and Commonwealth featherweight, British super featherweight champion
Liam Smith (born 1988), British, Commonwealth, and WBO light middleweight champion
Callum Smith (born 1990), WBA (Super) and The Ring super middleweight champion

Yafai brothers
Khalid Yafai (born 1989), WBA super flyweight champion
Gamal Yafai (born 1991), Commonwealth super bantamweight champion
Galal Yafai (born 1992), light flyweight gold medal at 2018 Commonwealth Games

United States
Ali family
Muhammad Ali: 1942-01-17 to 2016-06-03, WBA, WBC, and The Ring heavyweight champion
Rahman Ali: 1943-07-18 to ----, (Muhammad's brother), heavyweight
Laila Ali: 1977-12-30 to ----, (Muhammad's daughter), WBC female super middleweight champion
Ibn Ali: 1979-01-31 to ----, (Rahman's son), cruiserweight and heavyweight
Nico Ali Walsh: 2001 to ----, (Rasheda's son), amateur boxer
 
Ayala family
Tony Ayala Sr.: 1935-07-31 to 2014-04-10, former boxer and trainer of his four sons
Mike Ayala: 1958-01-19 to ----, (Tony Sr.'s son), WBC-NABF super bantamweight, WBC-NABF featherweight champion
Sammy Ayala: 1959-07-31 to ----, (Tony Sr.'s son), welterweight
Tony Ayala Jr.: 1963-02-13 to ----, (Tony Sr.'s son), light middleweight
Paulie Ayala: ---- to ----, (Tony Sr.'s son), featherweight
Edgar Ayala

Baer brothers
Max Baer: 1909-02-11 to 1959-11-21, heavyweight world champion
Buddy Baer: 1915-01-11 to 1986-01-18, heavyweight

Baltazar brothers
Frankie Baltazar: 1958-04-14 to ----, super featherweight contender
Tony Baltazar: 1961-02-05 to ----, lightweight contender
Robert Baltazar: 1963-01-16 to ----, welterweight contender

Beard brothers
Rickey Beard: 1959-03-16 to 1985-11-07, welterweight
Jackie Beard: 1961-09-10 to ----, WBC-NABF featherweight champion
Obie Beard: ---- to ----, light welterweight

Byrd family
Joe Byrd Sr.: ---- to ----, 1992 US Olympic Team head coach
Antoine Byrd: 1962-02-27 to ----, (Joe Sr.'s son), IBF-USBA super middleweight champion
Tracy Byrd: 1964-08-27 to ----, (Joe Sr.'s daughter), IBA female lightweight, WIBO light welterweight champion
Patrick Byrd: 1968-11-28 to ----, (Joe Sr.'s son), welterweight
Chris Byrd: 1970-08-15 to ----, (Joe Sr.'s son), IBF, and WBO heavyweight champion
Lamon Brewster: 1973-06-05 to ----, (Joe Sr.'s nephew), WBO heavyweight champion

Carbajal brothers
Michael Carbajal: 1967-09-17 to ----, light flyweight silver medal at 1988 Summer Olympics, WBC, IBF, and WBO light flyweight champion
Cruz Carbajal: 1974-05-03 to ----, WBO bantamweight champion

Canizales brothers
Gaby Canizales: 1960-05-01 to ----, WBA, and WBO bantamweight champion
Orlando Canizales: 1965-11-25 to ----, IBF bantamweight champion

Charlo brothers
Jermall Charlo: 1990-05-19 to ----, IBF light middleweight, WBC middleweight champion
Jermell Charlo: 1990-05-19 to ----, WBA (Super), WBC, IBF, and The Ring light middleweight champion

Cisneros family
Ron Cisneros: 1961-07-13 to ----, bantamweight
Mike Alvarado: 1980-07-28 to ----, (Ron's son), WBO light welterweight champion
Ricky Lopez: 1987-03-03 to ----, (Mike's cousin), super bantamweight

Cortez brothers
Joe Cortez: 1943-10-13 to ----, featherweight and world championship referee
Mike Cortez: 1942-09-27 to ----, lightweight

Curry brothers
Bruce Curry: 1956-03-29 to ----, WBC light welterweight champion
Graylin Curry: 1960-01-18 to ----, light middleweight
Donald Curry: 1961-09-07 to ----, WBA, WBC, IBF welterweight, and The Ring welterweight, WBC light middleweight champion

De La Hoya family
Joel De La Hoya Sr.: ---- to ----, Mike Anchondo & Daniel Ponce de León's manager
Joel De La Hoya Jr.: ---- to ----, (Joel Sr.'s son), Diego De La Hoya's manager
Oscar De La Hoya: 1971-02-04 to ----, (Joel Sr.'s son), lightweight gold medal at 1992 Summer Olympics, WBO super featherweight, IBF, and WBO lightweight, WBC light welterweight, WBC welterweight, WBA, WBC, and The Ring light middleweight, WBO middleweight champion
Diego De La Hoya: 1994-08-13 to ----, (Oscar's cousin), WBC-NABF, and WBO-NABO super bantamweight champion

Douglas family
William Douglas: 1940-03-21 to ----, 1999-10-07, middleweight and light heavyweight
James Buster Douglas: 1960-04-07 to ----, (William's son), WBA, WBC, and IBF heavyweight champion
Lamar Douglas (James' son)

Eklund & Ward brothers
Dicky Eklund: 1957-05-03 to ----, welterweight
Micky Ward: 1965-10-04 to ----, WBU light welterweight champion

Flanagan brothers
Del Flanagan: 1928-11-18 to 2003-12-26, welterweight
Glen Flanagan: 1926-11-16 to 1979-01-28, featherweight

Folley family
Zora Folley, 1931-03-27 to 1972-07-07, heavyweight
Robert Folley: 1959-11-27 to ----, (Zora's son), light heavyweight and cruiserweight

Foreman family 
George Foreman: 1949-01-10 to ----, WBA, WBC, IBF, and The Ring heavyweight champion 
Freeda Foreman: 1976-10-16 to 2019-03-08, (George's daughter), middleweight 
George Foreman III: 1983-01-23 to ----, (George's son), heavyweight

Frazier family
Joe Frazier: 1944-01-12 to 2011-11-07, NYSAC, WBA, WBC, and The Ring heavyweight champion
Marvis Frazier: 1960-09-12 to ----, (Joe's son), heavyweight
Jackie Frazier-Lyde: 1961-12-02 to ----, (Joe's daughter), WIBA light heavyweight champion
Tyrone Frazier: 1962-05-11 to ----, (Joe's nephew), super middleweight and light heavyweight
Joe Frazier Jr.: 1962-10-02 to ----, (Joe's son), welterweight

Fullmer brothers
Gene Fullmer: 1931-07-21 to 2015-04-27, WBA middleweight champion
Jay Fullmer: 1937-03-09 to 2015-04-22, lightweight and welterweight
Don Fullmer: 1939-02-21 to 2012-01-28, middleweight

Garcia family
Eduardo Garcia: 1942-12-23 to ----, world champion trainer
Robert Garcia: 1975-01-29 to ----, (Eduardo's son), IBF super featherweight champion
Miguel Garcia: 1987-12-15 to ----, (Eduardo's son), WBO featherweight, WBO super featherweight champion
Irving Garcia: 1989-01-20 to ----, (Robert's nephew), lightweight prospect
Javier Garcia Calderón: 1989-01-20 to ----, (Robert's nephew), lightweight
David Garcia: 1990-09-11 to ----, (Robert's nephew), welterweight

Gardner brothers
George Gardner: 1877-03-17 to 1954-07-08, light heavyweight world champion
Billy Gardner: 1879-07-04 to 1950-02-23, New England featherweight champion
Jimmy Gardner: 1885-12-25 to 1964-05, welterweight world champion

Gibbons brothers
Mike Gibbons: 1887-07-20 to 1956-08-31, middleweight
Tommy Gibbons: 1891-03-22 to 1960-11-19, heavyweight title challenger

Hagler & Sims brothers
Marvin Hagler: 1954-05-23 to 2021-03-13, WBA, WBC, IBF, and The Ring middleweight champion
Robbie Sims: 1959-11-05 to ----, middleweight title challenger

Harris & Johnson brothers
James Harris
Mark Johnson: 1971-08-13 to ----, IBF flyweight, IBF, and WBO super flyweight champion

Hearns family
Thomas Hearns: 1958-10-18 to ----, WBA welterweight, WBC light middleweight, WBO super middleweight, WBA, and WBC light heavyweight, IBO cruiserweight champion
Billy Hearns: ---- to ----, (Thomas's brother), super featherweight
Ronald Hearns: 1978-03-19 to ----, (Thomas's son), middleweight title challenger

Holyfield family
Evander Holyfield: 1962-10-19 to ----, Undisputed cruiserweight and heavyweight champion
Evan Holyfield: 1997-10-23 to ----, light middleweight contender

Hopkins family
Bernard Hopkins: 1965-01-15 to ----, WBA, WBC, IBF, WBO, and The Ring middleweight, WBA (Super), WBC, IBF, and The Ring light heavyweight champion
Demetrius Hopkins: 1980-10-10 to ----, (Bernard's nephew), IBF-USBA light welterweight

Jackson family
Julian Jackson: 1960-09-12 to ----, WBA light middleweight, WBC middleweight champion
Julius Jackson: 1987-08-01 to ----, (Julian's son), super middleweight
John Jackson: 1989-01-16 to ----, (Julian's son), light middleweight

Jones family
Roy Jones Sr.
Roy Jones Jr.: 1969-01-16 to ----, IBF middleweight, IBF super middleweight, WBA, WBC, IBF, IBO, and The Ring light heavyweight, WBA heavyweight champion

Judah family
Johnny Saxton: 1930-07-04 to 2008-10-04, The Ring welterweight champion
Yoel Judah: 1956 to ----, (Johnny's nephew), boxing trainer and kickboxing champion
Daniel Judah: 1977-08-08 to ----, (Yoel's son), light heavyweight
Zab Judah: 1977-10-27 to ----, (Yoel's son), IBF, and WBO light welterweight, WBA (Undisputed), WBC, IBF, and The Ring welterweight champion
Josiah Judah: 1978-08-21 to ----, (Yoel's son), super middleweight

Leonard brothers
Roger Leonard: 1953-07-21 to ----, light welterweight
Sugar Ray Leonard: 1956-05-17 to ----, WBA, WBC, and The Ring welterweight, WBA, and The Ring light middleweight, WBC, and The Ring middleweight, WBC super middleweight, WBC light heavyweight champion

Litzau brothers
Allen Litzau: 1982-04-12 to ----, featherweight
Jason Litzau: 1983-06-29 to ----, NABF super featherweight champion

Lopez brothers
Ernie Lopez: 1945-09-24 to 2009-10-03, welterweight title challenger
Danny Lopez: 1952-07-06 to ----, WBC featherweight champion

Magdaleno brothers
Diego Magdaleno: 1986-10-28 to ----, NABF super featherweight champion
Jessie Magdaleno: 1991-11-08 to ----, WBO super bantamweight champion
Marco Magdaleno: 1995-11-02 to ----, lightweight

Mancini family
Lenny Mancini: 1919-07-12 to 2003-11-29, lightweight
Ray Mancini: 1961-03-04 to ----, (Lenny's son), WBA lightweight champion

Mayweather family
Floyd Mayweather Sr.: 1952-10-19 to ----, super welterweight, trainer
Roger Mayweather: 1961-04-24 to 2020-03-17, (Floyd Sr.'s brother), Floyd Jr.'s Trainer, WBA super featherweight, WBC light welterweight champion
Jeff Mayweather: 1964-07-04 to ----, (Floyd Sr.'s brother) 1990s lightweight
Floyd Mayweather Jr.: 1977-02-24 to ----, (Floyd Sr.'s son), WBC super featherweight, WBC, and The Ring lightweight, WBC light welterweight, WBA, WBC, IBF, and The Ring welterweight, WBA, WBC, and The Ring light middleweight champion
Justin Jones: 1987-04-21 to ----, (Floyd Sr.'s son)

McCall family
Oliver McCall: 1965-4-21 to ----, WBC heavyweight champion
Elijah McCall: 1988-03-03 to ----, heavyweight

McCrory brothers
Milton McCrory: 1962-02-07 to ----, WBC welterweight champion
Steve McCrory: 1964-04-13 to 2000-08-01, flyweight gold medal at 1984 Summer Olympics

McGirt family
Buddy McGirt: 1964-01-17 to ----, IBF light welterweight, WBC welterweight champion
James McGirt Jr.: 1982-11-25 to ----, (Buddy's son), super middleweight

McNeeley family
Tom McNeeley Sr.: ---- to ----, heavyweight
Tom McNeeley Jr.: 1937-02-27 to 2011-10-25, heavyweight world title challenger
Peter McNeeley: 1986-10-06 to ----, heavyweight

Norris brothers
Orlin Norris: 1965-10-04 to ----, WBA cruiserweight champion
Terry Norris: 1967-06-17 to ----, WBC, and IBF light middleweight champion

Patterson family
Floyd Patterson: 1935-01-04 to 2006-05-11, WBA, and The Ring heavyweight champion
Raymond ”Ray” Patterson: 1942-10-24 to ----, (Floyd's brother), heavyweight
Tracy Harris Patterson: 1964-12-26 to ----, (Floyd's adopted son), WBC super bantamweight, IBF super featherweight champion
Perez Brothers
Irleis (Cubanito ) Perez
Tomas Perez
Quarry brothers
Jerry Quarry: 1945-05-15 to 1999-01-03, heavyweight
Mike Quarry: 1951-03-04 to 2006-06-11, light heavyweight
Bobby Quarry: 1962-11-11 to ----, heavyweight

Richardson family
Greg Richardson: 1958-02-07 to ----, WBC bantamweight champion
Durrell Richardson: 1979-07-07 to ----, light middleweight 
Chester: ---- to ----, Golden Gloves champion
Randy: ---- to ----, Golden Gloves champion
Ollie: ---- to ----, Golden Gloves champion

Russell brothers
Gary Russell Jr.: 1988-06-05 to ----, WBC featherweight champion
Gary Allen Russell: 1993-02-04 to ----, 2010 National Golden Gloves light welterweight champion

Sandoval brothers
Alberto Sandoval: 1958-03-12 to ----, bantamweight
Richie Sandoval: 1960-10-18 to ----, WBA bantamweight champion

Shuler brothers
James Shuler: 1959-05-29 to 1986-03-17, WBC-NABF middleweight champion
Marvin Shuler: 1960-06-03

Spinks family
Leon Spinks: 1953-07-11 to 2021-02-05, WBA, WBC, and The Ring heavyweight champion
Michael Spinks: 1956-07-13 to 2021-02-05, (Leon's brother), WBA, WBC, IBF, and The Ring light heavyweight, IBF, and The Ring heavyweight champion
Leon Spinks Jr.: 1970-09-16 to 1990-07-22, (Leon's son), fought as Leon Calvin
Darrel Spinks: 1973-07-24 to ----, (Leon's son), super welterweight
Cory Spinks: 1978-02-20 to ----, (Leon's son), WBA, WBC, IBF, The Ring welterweight, IBF light middleweight champion
Leon Spinks III: 1988-02-14 to ----, (Leon's grandson)

Tate brothers
Thomas Tate: 1965-12-19 to ----, WBC-NABF super middleweight champion, middleweight and super middleweight world title challenger
Frank Tate: 1964-08-27 to ----, IBF middleweight champion

Tubbs family
Tony Tubbs: 1958-02-15 to ----, WBA heavyweight champion
Nate Tubbs: 1964-12-01 to ----, (Tony's brother), heavyweight
Robert Tubbs: 1972-12-12 to ----, (Tony's cousin), middleweight
Roy Dale: 1942 to ----, (Tony's uncle), middleweight
Antwaun Taylor: 1985-01-19 to ----, (Tony's son)

Tucker family
Bob Tucker: ---- to ----,
Tony Tucker: 1958-12-27 to ----, IBF heavyweight champion

Vargas brothers
Fernando Vargas: 1977-12-07 to ----, WBA, and IBF light middleweight champion
Rogelio Vargas: 1982-11-25 to ----, super middleweight

Webber sisters
Cora Webber: 1958 to ----, IFBA light middleweight champion
Dora Webber: 1958 to ----, IWBF lightweight champion

Zivic brothers
Fritzie Zivic: 1913-05-08 to 1984-05-18, NYSAC, NBA, and Ring Magazine welterweight champion
Jack Zivic: 1903-06-23 to 1973-05-22, lightweight and welterweight contender
Peter Zivic: 1901-03-26 to 1987-01-29, bantamweight and featherweight contender
Eddie Zivic 1910-05-30 to 1996-04-15, welterweight contender

Venezuela
España brothers
Ernesto España: 1954-11-07 to ----, WBA lightweight champion
Crisanto España: 1964-10-25 to ----, WBA welterweight champion

See also
List of current world boxing champions

References

Families
Boxing families
Combat sports families